USS LST-218 was a  in the United States Navy during World War II. She was later sold to South Korean Navy as ROKS Bi Bong (LST-809).

Construction and career 
LST-218 was laid down on 11 February 1943 at Chicago Bridge and Iron Co., Quincy, Massachusetts. Launched on 20 July 1943 and commissioned on 12 August 1943.

Service in the United States 
During World War II, LST-218 was assigned to the Asiatic-Pacific theater. She took part in the Gilbert Islands operations from 21 November 8 December 1943. She also participated in the occupation of Kwajalein and Majuro Atolls from 31 January to 8 February 1944, the occupation of Eniwetok Atoll from 17 to 23 February 1944, the capture and occupation of Tinian from 24 July to 10 August 1944.

Throughout post-war year service, she was sent for occupation service in the Far East from 17 to 29 October 1945 and 16 November 1945 to 19 January 1946.

LST-218 was decommissioned on 19 January 1946 and was assigned to Commander Naval Forces Far East (COMNAVFE) Shipping Control Authority for Japan (SCAJAP) from 19 January 1946 to 28 January 1950 in which she was designated Q020. She was put into the Pacific Reserve Fleet following the end of her service there and later loaned to South Korea.

She was struck from the Navy Register.

Service in South Korea 
ROKS Bi Bong was acquired by the South Korean Navy on 3 May 1955 and was commissioned on 13 September 1955.

Later in the 1970s, she was designated as LST-673.

She was decommissioned on 31 March 1997 and her fate is unknown.

Awards 
LST-218 have earned the following awards:

American Campaign Medal
Asiatic-Pacific Campaign Medal (4 battle stars)
World War II Victory Medal
Navy Occupation Service Medal (with Asia clasp)

Citations

Sources 
 
 
 
 

World War II amphibious warfare vessels of the United States
Ships built in Seneca, Illinois
1943 ships
LST-1-class tank landing ships of the United States Navy
Ships transferred from the United States Navy to the Republic of Korea Navy